Denis Mujkić (born 2 September 1983) is a Bosnian football goalkeeper who is currently a Free Agent.

Club career
Born in Tuzla, SR Bosnia and Herzegovina, at time still within Yugoslavia, Mujkić started playing with FK Budućnost Banovići.  After a  spell at NK Jedinstvo Bihać, he signs with FK Sloboda Tuzla where he plays 4 seasons.  He played with all 3 clubs in the Bosnian-Herzegovinian Premier League.  In 2012, he signs with FK Novi Pazar playing in the Serbian SuperLiga.  After playing in Serbia, he returns to Bosnia and joins his former club FK Budućnost Banovići now playing in the First League of the Federation of Bosnia and Herzegovina.

International career
In 2007, he played one game for an unofficial Bosnia and Herzegovina selection.

References

External links
 

1983 births
Living people
Sportspeople from Tuzla
Association football goalkeepers
Bosnia and Herzegovina footballers
FK Budućnost Banovići players
NK Jedinstvo Bihać players
FK Sloboda Tuzla players
FK Novi Pazar players
Premier League of Bosnia and Herzegovina players
First League of the Federation of Bosnia and Herzegovina players
Serbian SuperLiga players
Bosnia and Herzegovina expatriate footballers
Expatriate footballers in Serbia
Bosnia and Herzegovina expatriate sportspeople in Serbia